The National Youth Council of Namibia  is charged with policy formulation and implementation on issues bordering on youth development in Namibia. It is the umbrella body of the youths of Namibia and was given legal recognition in 1990 at the time of independence. It is affiliated to the Pan-African Youth Union and represents about 60 000 Namibian youths.

Structure
Youth, according to the youth policy, acknowledged youths as persons between the ages of 18 to 35. The National Youth Council of Namibia has 120 Local Government Branches. All Local Government branches are led by coordinators and youth leaders. It is led by an elected chairperson every after 5 years. SWAPO politburo member, Mandela Kapere, is the current chairperson.

See also
Panafrican Youth Union
World Assembly of Youth

References

Youth councils
1990 establishments in Namibia